Henri Massis (21 March 1886 – 16 April 1970) was a conservative French essayist, literary critic and literary historian.

Biography
Massis was born on 21 March 1886 in Paris, France. He attended Lycée Condorcet and University of Paris. He began his publishing career in his early twenties with his works Comment Émile Zola Composait ses Romans, Le Puits de Pyrrhon, and La Pensée de Maurice Barrès.

He collaborated with his friend Alfred de Tarde, they published essays commenting on the French university system and the generation of 1912.

Massis converted to Catholicism in 1913 and, following World War I, called for a revival of the French spirit and Catholicism. Starting in 1920, he served as editor for the newly formed Revue Universelle and worked to spread Christian political philosophy. He published two volumes of Jugements that critically analysed the moral teachings of numerous writers such as Ernest Renan and André Gide. Massis' political writings expressed his concerns over what he viewed as a threat to postwar French society, including Bolshevism and Oriental mysticism.

While involved in the Vichy Government during World War II, Massis refused to collaborate with the Nazi movement. After the war, he was placed in an internment camp for only one month, and then released. Massis worked for Plon after the war, and his writings reflected his disdain of Nazism in Germany, and Bolshevism in Russia. Massis was elected to the Académie française in 1960 and died in Paris on 16 April 1970.

Bibliography

 (1905). Comment Émile Zola Composait ses Romans.
 (1907). Le Puits de Pyrrhon.
 (1909). La Pensée de Maurice Barrès.
 (1911). L'Esprit de la nouvelle Sorbonne, [with Alfred de Tarde].
 (1913). Les Jeunes Gens d'aujourd'hui, [with Alfred de Tarde].
 (1915). Romain Rolland contre la France.
 (1915). Luther Prophète du Germanisme.
 (1916). La Vie d'Ernest Psichari.
 (1916). Impressions de Guerre.
 (1917). Le Sacrifice (1914-1916).
 (1920). La Trahison de Constantin.
 (1921). Jérusalem le Jeudi-Saint de 1918.
 (1923). Jugements I: Renan, France, Barrès.
 (1924). Jugements II: André Gide, Romain Rolland, Georges Duhamel, Julien Benda, les Chapelles Littéraires.
 (1924). De Lorette à Jérusalem.
 (1924). Le Réalisme de Pascal.
 (1925). Jacques Rivière.
 (1927). En Marge de "Jugements".
 (1927). Réflexions sur l'Art du Roman.
 (1927). Défense de l'Occident.
 (1928). Avant-postes.
 (1931). Évocations. Souvenirs (1905-1911).
 (1932). Dix ans Après.
 (1934). Débats, [3 vol.].
 (1936). Les Cadets de l'Alcazar.
 (1936). Notre ami Psichari.
 (1937). Le Drame de Marcel Proust.
 (1937). L'Honneur de Servir.
 (1939). Chefs. Les Dictateurs et Nous.
 (1940). La Guerre de Trente ans: Destin d'un Age (1909-1939).
 (1941). Les Idées Restent.
 (1942). La Prière de Lyautey.
 (1944). Découverte de la Russie.
 (1948). D'André Gide à Marcel Proust.
 (1949). Allemagne d'hier et d'Après-demain.
 (1949). Portrait de M. Renan.
 (1951). Maurras et Notre Temps [2 Vol.].
 (1956). L'Occident et son Destin.
 (1958). Visage des Idées.
 (1948). À Contre-courant.
 (1958). L'Europe en Question.
 (1959). De l'Homme à Dieu.
 (1961). Salazar Face à Face.
 (1962). Barrès et Nous, Suivi d’une Correspondance Inédite (1906-1923).
 (1967). Au Long d'une Vie.

Works in English translation
 (1928). Defence of the West, Harcourt, Brace & Company [with a preface by G. K. Chesterton].
 (1958). The Choice before Europe, London: Eyre & Spottiswoode [with Alphonse Pierre Juin].

References

Further reading
 Christophe, Lucien (1961). "Regards sur Henri Massis," Revue Générale Belge, pp. 17–41.
 Connell, Allison (1962). "The Younger Generation of 1912 in Agathon's Report and in the Novel," Modern Philology, Vol. 65, No. 4, pp. 343–352.
 Dubeon, Lucien (1923). "Henri Massis ou la Génération de l'Absolu," L'Éclair, 12 juin, No. 814.
 Griffiths, Richard (1965). The Reactionary Revolution: The Catholic Revival in French Literature, 1870-1914, New York: Ungar.
 Molnar, Thomas (1959). "French Conservative Thought," Modern Age, Vol. III, No. 3.
 Toda, Michel (1987). Henri Massis: Un Témoin de la Droite Intellectuelle, Paris: Table Ronde.
 Wohl, Robert (2009). The Generation of 1914, Harvard University Press.

External links
 Académie française
 
 
 Pictures of Henri Massis 

1886 births
1970 deaths
Writers from Paris
French male essayists
French Roman Catholic writers
French literary critics
French literary historians
Lycée Condorcet alumni
People affiliated with Action Française
People of Vichy France
University of Paris alumni
Members of the Académie Française
Order of the Francisque recipients
20th-century French essayists
20th-century French male writers